Lukman or Lucman may refer to the following people

Given name
Ingatun-Lukman Gumuntul Istarul Filipino politician
Lukman Alade Fakeye (born 1983), Nigerian sculptor and woodcarver
Lukman Faily (born 1966), Iraqi Ambassador to the United States
Lukman Haruna (born 1990), Nigerian football midfielder
Lukman Meriwala (born 1991), Indian cricketer 
Lukman Olaonipekun (born 1975), Nigerian photojournalist
Lukman Saketi (born 1911), Indonesian sports shooter
Lukman Sardi (born 1971), Indonesian actor

Surname
Imoro Lukman (born 1984), Ghanaian football player
Leon Lukman (born 1931), Serbian pole vaulter
M. H. Lukman (1920–1965), Indonesian politician
Mubashir Lucman, Pakistani film director, journalist and talk show host
Okky Lukman (born 1984), Indonesian actress, comedian, and host
Rashid Lucman (1924–1984), Filipino legislator 
Rilwanu Lukman (1938–2014), Nigerian engineer

See also
Luckman, a surname
Lukeman (disambiguation)